"The Last Day" is a mini-episode of the British science fiction television programme Doctor Who. It was made available on BBC iPlayer and YouTube on 21 November 2013, as part of the BBC One lead-up to the show's 50th anniversary special.

Synopsis
The episode is seen through the eyes of a newly recruited soldier in Arcadia, the "safest place on Gallifrey", on their first day in the defence of their home planet during the Time War. The new recruit is having a headcama recording device linked directly to the brainadjusted by one of their fellow soldiers.  The recruit is informed of the potential risk of hallucinations as a side effect of the technology and is told that the visions are not premonitions. The instructor goes on to say that in the event of death, the memories recorded will be extracted and placed on a "family drive".

The soldier then meets his commander, who gives him an introductory speech about their defences.  He describes "sky-trenches", the planetary defences that hold back invading forces.  He tells the soldier that there are four hundred sky-trenches guarding Arcadia and that nothing in history has ever breached two of them, though during his speech, huge explosions can be seen up above. The instructor takes the soldier to a defensive turret and instructs him on using scanners to check for objects in the sky.  He tells the soldier that they must be thorough and vigilant, as it would only take one Dalek to wipe out the entire city.  The instructor directs the soldier to zoom in on a potential targetwhich he assumes is a birdbut is horrified to see that it is in fact a Dalek.  The Dalek is quickly joined by many more, and the skies fill with the invading forces.  A Dalek fires its extermination ray at the soldier, who screams as the headcam display flashes red and then fades to static.

Production 
"The Last Day" was recorded at Roath Lock on 9 May 2013. The remark that moments of "an intimate nature will be flagged with a triangle" is a reference to an experiment adopted by Channel 4 from September 1986 to January 1987, in which explicit adult art films screened at night carried a superimposed red warning triangle.

Home media 
The episode was included as an extra on the Blu-ray and DVD release of "The Day of the Doctor". It was also included as an extra in the 50th anniversary collector's edition Blu-ray and DVD releases.

References

External links 

Dalek stories
Television episodes written by Steven Moffat
2013 British television episodes
Doctor Who mini-episodes
Found footage television episodes